State leaders in the 7th century BC – State leaders in the 5th century BC – State leaders by year

This is a list of state leaders in the 6th century BC (600–501 BC).

Africa: North

Carthage

Carthage (complete list) –
Didonian
Hanno I, King (c.580–c.556 BC)
Malchus, King (c.556–c.550 BC)
Magonids
Mago I, King (c.550–c.530 BC)
Hasdrubal I, King (c.530–c.510 BC)
Hamilcar I, King (c.510–480 BC)

Cyrene

Cyrene (complete list) –
Battus I, King (630–600 BC)
Arcesilaus I, King (600–583 BC)
Battus II, King (583–560 BC)
Arcesilaus II, King (560–550 BC)
Battus III, King (550–530 BC)
Arcesilaus III, King (530–515 BC)
Battus IV, King (515–465 BC)

Egypt: Late Period

Twenty-sixth Dynasty of the Late Period (complete list) –
Necho II, Pharaoh (610–595 BC)
Psamtik II, Pharaoh (595–589 BC)
Apries, Pharaoh (589–570 BC)
Amasis II, Pharaoh (570–526 BC)
Psamtik III, Pharaoh (526–525 BC)

Kush

Kingdom of Kush (complete list) –
Anlamani, King (620–600 BC)
Aspelta, King (600–580 BC)
Aramatle-qo, King (568–555 BC)
Malonaqen, King (555–542 BC)
Analmaye, King (542–538 BC)
Amaninatakilebte, King (538–519 BC)
Karkamani, King (519–510 BC)
Amaniastabarqa, King (510–487 BC)

Asia

Asia: East

China: Spring and Autumn period

Zhou, China: Eastern Zhou (complete list) –
Ding, King (606–586 BC)
Jian, King (585–572 BC)
Ling, King (571–545 BC)
Jing, King (544–520 BC)
Dao, King (520 BC)
Jìng, King (519–477 BC)

Cai (complete list) –
Wen, Marquis (611–592 BC)
Jing, Marquis (591–543 BC)
Ling, Marquis (542–531 BC)
Ping, Marquis (530–522 BC)
Dao, Marquis (521–519 BC)
Zhao, Marquis (518–491 BC)

Cao (complete list) –
Wen, Duke (617–595 BC)
Xuan, Duke (594–578 BC)
Cheng, Duke (577–555 BC)
Wu, Duke (554–528 BC)
Ping, Duke (527–524 BC)
Dao, Duke (523–515 BC)
Sheng, Duke (514–510 BC)
Yin, Duke (509–506 BC)
Jing, Duke (505–502 BC)
Cao Bo yang, ruler (501–487 BC)

Chen (complete list) –
Xia Zhengshu, ruler (7th–6th century BC)
Cheng, Duke (c.6th century BC)
Ai, Duke (c.6th century BC)
Liu, Prince (c.6th century BC)
(Chuan Fengxu), ruler (c.6th century BC)
Hui, Duke (6th–5th century BC)

Chu (complete list) –
Zhuang, King (613–591 BC)
Gong, King (590–560 BC)
Kang, King (559–545 BC)
Jia'ao, ruler (544–541 BC)
Ling, King (540–529 BC)
Zi'ao, ruler (529 BC)
Ping, King (528–516 BC)
Zhao, King (515–489 BC)

Jin (complete list) –
Cheng, Duke (606–600 BC)
Jing, Duke (599–581 BC)
Li, Duke (580–573 BC)
Dao, Duke (573–558 BC)
Ping, Duke (557–532 BC)
Zhao, Duke (531–526 BC)
Qing, Duke (525–512 BC)
Ding, Duke (511–475 BC)

Lu (complete list) –
Xuan, Duke (608–591 BC)
Cheng, Duke (590–573 BC)
Xiang, Duke (572–542 BC)
Ziye, ruler (542 BC)
Zhao, Duke (541–510 BC)
Ding, Duke (509–495 BC)

Qi: House of Jiang (complete list) –
Hui, Duke (608–599 BC)
Qing, Duke (598–582 BC)
Ling, Duke (581–554 BC)
Zhuang II, Duke (553–548 BC)
Jing, Duke (547–490 BC)

Qin (complete list) –
Huan, Duke (603–577 BC)
Jing, Duke (576–537 BC)
Ai, Duke (536–501 BC)

Song (complete list) –
Wen, Duke (610–589 BC)
Gong, Duke (588–576 BC)
Ping, Duke (575–532 BC)
Yuan, Duke (531–517 BC)
Jing, Duke (516–451 BC)

Wey (complete list) –
Cheng, Duke (634–600 BC)
Mu, Duke (599–589 BC)
Ding, Duke (588–577 BC)
Xian, Duke (576–559 BC)
Shang, Duke (558–547 BC)
Xian, Duke (546–544 BC)
Xiang, Duke (543–535 BC)
Ling, Duke (534–493 BC)

Wu (complete list) –
Shoumeng, ruler (585–561 BC)
Zhufan, King (560–548 BC)
Yuji, King (547–544 BC)
Yumei, King (543–527 BC)
Liao, King (526–515 BC)
Helü, King (515–496 BC)

Yue (complete list) –
Wuren of Yue, Marquis (7th–6th century BC)
Wushen of Yue, Marquis (6th century BC)
Futan of Yue, Marquis (565─538 BC)
Yunchang of Yue, King (?─497 BC)

Zheng (complete list) –
Xiang, Duke (604–587 BC)
Dao, Duke (586–585 BC)
Cheng, Duke (584–581 BC, 581–571 BC)
Xu, Prince (581 BC)
Xi, Duke (581 BC, 570–566 BC)
Jian, Duke (565–530 BC)
Ding, Duke (529–514 BC)
Xian, Duke (513–501 BC)

Asia: Southeast
Vietnam
Hồng Bàng dynasty (complete list) –
Tân line, King (c.660–c.569 BC)
Nhâm line, King (c.568–408 BC)

Asia: South

India

Magadha: Haryanka dynasty (complete list) –
Bimbisara (c.544–c.492 BC)

Sri Lanka

Asia: West

Neo-Babylonian Empire: Dynasty XI (complete list) –
Nebuchadnezzar II, King (c.605–562 BC)
Amel-Marduk, King (c.562–560 BC)
Neriglissar, King (c.560–556 BC)
Labashi-Marduk, King (c.556 BC)
Nabonidus, King (c.556–539 BC)

Elam: Humban-Tahrid dynasty (complete list) –
Humban-Tahrah II, King (7th/6th century)
Hallutash-Inshushinak, King (7th/6th century)
Ummanunu I, King (first quarter of 6th century BC)
Shilhak-Inshushinak II, King (first quarter of 6th century BC)
Temti-Humban-Inshushinak II, King (pre-550 BC–?)
Halkatash, King (?–c.549/8 BC)
Açina, King (?–522 BC)
Ummanunu II or Humban-Nikash IV (Ummaniš), King (522–521 BC)
Atta-hamiti-Inshushinak, King (?–520/19 BC)

Kingdom of Judah (complete list) –
Chronologies as established by Albright
Jehoiakim, King (609–598 BC)
Jeconiah, King (598 BC)
Zedekiah, King (597–587 BC)

Lydia (complete list) –
Sadyattes, King (629–617 BC or c.625–c.600 BC)
Alyattes, King (617–560 BC or c.600–560 BC)
Croesus, King (560–546 BC or 560–547 BC)

Median Empire (complete list) –
Cyaxares, King (625–585 BC)
Astyages, King (585–550 BC)

Anshan (complete list) –
Cyrus I, King (640–580 BC)
Cambyses I, King (580–559 BC)
Cyrus the Great, II
King of Anshan (559–530 BC)
King of Persia (?–530 BC)

First Persian Empire: Achaemenid Empire(complete list) –
Cyrus the Great, II, King of Anshan (559–530 BC), King of Kings (?–530 BC)
Cambyses II, King of Kings (530–522 BC)
Smerdis, King of Kings (522 BC)
Gaumata, false Smerdis, usurper King (522 BC)
Darius I, King of Kings (522–486 BC)

Urartu (complete list) –
Rusa III, King (629–590/615 BC)
Sarduri IV, King (615–595 BC)
Rusa IV, King (595–585 BC)

Europe

Europe: Balkans

Athens (complete list) –

Critias, Archon (600–599 BC)
Cypselus, Archon (597–596 BC)
Telecles, Archon (596–595 BC)
Philombrotus, Archon (595–594 BC)
Solon, Archon (594–593 BC)
Dropides, Archon (593–592 BC)
Eucrates, Archon (592–591 BC)
Simon, Archon (591–590 BC)
Phormion, Archon (589–588 BC)
Philippus, Archon (588–587 BC)
Damasias, Archon (582–581 BC)
Damasias, Archon (581–580 BC)
Archestratidas, Archon (577–576 BC)

Aristomenes, Archon (570–569 BC)
Hippocleides, Archon (566–565 BC)
Komeas, Archon (561–560 BC)
Hegestratus, Archon (560–559 BC)
Hegesias, Archon (556–555 BC)
Euthidemus, Archon (555–554 BC)
Erxicleides, Archon (548–547 BC)
Thespius, Archon (547–546 BC)
Phormion, Archon (546–545 BC)
Thericles, Archon (533–532 BC)
Philoneus, Archon (528–527 BC)
Onetor, Archon (527–526 BC)
Hippias, Archon (526–525 BC)

Cleisthenes, Archon (525–524 BC)
Miltiades, Archon (524–523 BC)
Calliades, Archon (523–522 BC)
Pisistratus, Archon (522–521 BC)
Hebron (?), Archon (518–517 BC)
Harpactides, Archon (511–510 BC)
Scamandrius, Archon (510–509 BC)
Lysagoras, Archon (509–508 BC)
Isagoras, Archon (508–507 BC)
Alcmeon, Archon (507–506 BC)
Acestorides, Archon (504–503 BC)
Hermocreon, Archon (501–500 BC)

Corinth –
Periander, Tyrant (c.627–c.587 BC)
Psammetichus, Tyrant (c.587 BC–?)

Macedonia: Argead dynasty (complete list) –
Aeropus I, King (602–576 BC)
Alcetas I, King (576–547 BC)
Amyntas I, King (547–498 BC)

Sparta (complete list) –
Ariston, King (c.550–515 BC)
Demaratus, King (c.515–491 BC)

Europe: South

Roman Kingdom (complete list) –
Lucius Tarquinius Priscus, King (616–579 BC)
Servius Tullius, King (578–535 BC)
Lucius Tarquinius Superbus, King (535–510/509 BC)

Roman Republic (complete list) –

 
509
L. Iunius Brutus, Consul
L. Tarquinius Collatinus, Consul
Sp. Lucretius Tricipitinus, Consul suffectus
P. Valerius Poplicola, Consul suffectus
M. Horatius Pulvillus, Consul suffectus
508
P. Valerius Poplicola, Consul
T. Lucretius Tricipitinus, Consul
507
P. Valerius Poplicola, Consul
M. Horatius Pulvillus, Consul

506
Sp. Larcius Rufus (or Flavus), Consul
T. Herminius Aquilinus, Consul
505
M. Valerius Volusus, Consul
P. Postumius Tubertus, Consul
504
P. Valerius Poplicola, Consul
T. Lucretius Tricipitinus, Consul

503
Agrippa Menenius Lanatus, Consul
P. Postumius Tubertus, Consul
502
Opet. Verginius Tricostus, Consul
Sp. Cassius Vecellinus, Consul
501
Post. Cominius Auruncus, Consul
T. Lartius Flavus (or Rufus), Consul

Eurasia: Caucasus

Kingdom of Armenia (complete list) –
Orontes I Sakavakyats, King (570–560 BC)
Tigranes Orontid, King (560–535 BC)
Vahagn Orontid, King (6th century BC)
Hidarnes I, King (late 6th century BC)

References

State Leaders
-
6th-century BC rulers